The Swinford Museum is a small museum in the village of Filkins, west Oxfordshire, England.

The collection covers local domestic, agricultural, trade and craft tools. The museum is housed in a 17th-century cottage. It was founded by George Swinford in 1931, hence the name, with the help of Sir Stafford Cripps.

See also
 List of museums in Oxfordshire
 Museum of Oxford

References

External links
 Swinford Museum website

1931 establishments in England
Museums established in 1931
History museums in Oxfordshire
Biographical museums in Oxfordshire
Agricultural museums in England
Rural history museums in England
West Oxfordshire District